Maria Cornelia Vreeken (born 22 December 1928), née Corry Bouwman, also Corry Vreeken-Bouwman, is a Dutch chess player who holds the title of Woman Grandmaster (WGM, 1987). She is a five-time winner of the Dutch Women's Chess Championship (1960, 1962, 1964, 1966, 1970).

Biography
In the 1960s and 1970s, Corry Vreeken was one of the leading Dutch women's chess players. She is five time Dutch Women's Chess Champion: 1960, 1962, 1964, 1966 and 1970, and participated in many international chess tournaments. Her best results were in Emmen (1962), shared 1st - 3rd place in Beverwijk (1968) and won zonal tournament in Biel/Bienne (1980).

Corry Vreeken two times participated in the Women's World Chess Championship Interzonal Tournaments:
 In 1971, at Interzonal Tournament in Ohrid ranked 14th place;
 In 1976, at Interzonal Tournament in Rozendaal ranked 10th place.

Corry Vreeken played for Netherlands in the Women's Chess Olympiads:
 In 1963, at first board in the 2nd Chess Olympiad (women) in Split (+1, =5, -4),
 In 1966, at first board in the 3rd Chess Olympiad (women) in Oberhausen (+5, =3, -2),
 In 1974, at first board in the 6th Chess Olympiad (women) in Medellín (+4, =4, -3),
 In 1976, at second board in the 7th Chess Olympiad (women) in Haifa (+4, =2, -3),
 In 1978, at second board in the 8th Chess Olympiad (women) in Buenos Aires (+5, =4, -2),
 In 1980, at first board in the 9th Chess Olympiad (women) in Valletta (+4, =4, -3),
 In 1982, at first board in the 10th Chess Olympiad (women) in Lucerne (+2, =2, -6).

In 1968 she was awarded the FIDE Woman International Master (WIM) title and in 1987 the Woman Grandmaster (WGM) honorary title.

References

External links
 
 
 

1928 births
Living people
People from Enkhuizen
Dutch female chess players
Chess woman grandmasters
Chess Olympiad competitors
Sportspeople from North Holland